This is a list of books in the Sweet Valley University series, created by Francine Pascal.

List
 College Girls
 Love, Lies, and Jessica Wakefield
 What Your Parents Don't Know
 Anything for Love
 A Married Woman
 The Love of Her Life
 Good-bye to Love
 Home for Christmas*
 Sorority Scandal
 No Means No
 Take Back the Night*
 College Cruise
 SS Heartbreak
 Shipboard Wedding*
 Behind Closed Doors
 The Other Woman
 Deadly Attraction*
 Billie's Secret
 Broken Promises, Shattered Dreams
 Here Comes the Bride*
 For the Love of Ryan
 Elizabeth's Summer Love
 Lifeguards: Sweet Kiss of Summer*
 His Secret Past
 Busted!
 The Trial of Jessica Wakefield*
 Elizabeth and Todd Forever
 Elizabeth's Heartbreak
 One Last Kiss*
 Beauty and the Beach*
 The Truth about Ryan
 The Boys of Summer
 Out of the Picture
 Spy Girl
 Undercover Angels*
 Have You Heard About Elizabeth?
 Breaking Away
 Good-bye, Elizabeth*
 Elizabeth Loves New York
 Private Jessica
 Escape to New York*
 Sneaking In
 The Price of Love
 Love Me Always**
 Don't Let Go
 I'll Never Love Again
 You're Not My Sister
 No Rules
 Stranded
 Summer of Love*
 Living Together
 Fooling Around
 Truth or Dare*
 Rush Week
The First Time
 Dropping Out*
 Who Knew?
 The Dreaded Ex
 Elizabeth in Love*
 Secret Love Diaries: Elizabeth
 Secret Love Diaries: Jessica
 Secret Love Diaries: Sam
 Secret Love Diaries: Chloe
Where a thriller would fit into the series, though the thrillers don't follow the series

Thriller Editions
 Wanted For Murder
 He's Watching You
 Kiss of the Vampire
 The House of Death
 Running for Her Life
 The Roommate
 What Winston Saw
 Dead Before Dawn
 Killer at Sea
 Channel X
 Love and Murder
 Don't Answer the Phone
 Cyber Stalker: The Return of William White, Part 1
 Deadly Terror: The Return of William White, Part 2
 Loving the Enemy
 Killer Party
 Very Bad Things
 Face It

References

Sweet Valley University
Sweet Valley (franchise)
Romance novel series